The Vanni Van bombing, also referred to as the Murukandy claymore attack, was the bombing of a private van on May 23, 2008 which killed sixteen civilians, including five children. A local Human rights organization, NESOHR  alleged that the attack was carried out by the Deep Penetration Unit of the Sri Lankan army.

Background 
There had been series of attacks on LTTE commanders and Tamil civilians living in the rebel controlled Vanni region allegedly by the Deep Penetration Unit of the Sri Lankan army

Incident 
The incident took place when a private van was hit by a claymore mine  when it was returning from the Akkaraayan hospital to Kilinochchi on Murikandy -Akkaraayan Road on the May 23, 2008 at 2.15 in the afternoon. The Pro-LTTE NESHOR claimed that the attack was carried out by the Deep Penetration Unit of the Sri Lankan army. Tamilnet, a pro-rebel news website, claimed that earlier in the same day an ambulance was targeted in a similar fashion. It further claimed that the Deep Penetration Unit of the Sri Lankan army was responsible for both attacks.

See also 
 Shrine of Our Lady of Madhu
 Madhu church bombing
 2008 Sri Lanka bus bombings
 2008 Fort Railway Station Bombing

References

2008 crimes in Sri Lanka
Attacks on civilians attributed to the Sri Lanka Army
Massacres in Sri Lanka
Mass murder in 2008
Mass murder of Sri Lankan Tamils
Terrorist incidents in Sri Lanka in 2008